The 2012 Individual Speedway Junior World Championship was the 36th edition of the FIM World motorcycle speedway Under-21 Championships.

The final was run over a series of seven races between 21 July and November 2011. Michael Jepsen Jensen became the new champion.

Qualification 

In five Qualifying round started 80 riders and to Semi-finals qualified top 6 from each meetings. This 30 riders and 2 riders from Semi-final' host federations started in two Semi-finals. The top 7 riders from both SF were automatically qualified for all Final meetings.

Riders 
There were fourteen permanent riders (riders placed 1st to 7th in both semi finals were automatically qualified for all Final meetings). Two Wild Card riders were nominated to each final meeting (approval and nomination by CCP Bureau). Two Track Reserve riders were nominated by national federation.

In case of the absence of one or more riders in the final meetings, the first available Qualified Substitute rider or riders was/were elevated for that meeting, and took the place(s) of the relevant
missing rider(s). The list of Qualified Substitute riders was published by the CCP after the Semi-finals.

A starting position draw for each final meeting was balloted by the FIM.

Final Series

Classification 
The meeting classification was according to the points scored during the meeting (heats 1–20). The total points scored by each rider during each final meeting (heat 1–20) were credited also as World Championship points. The FIM Speedway Under 21 World Champion was the rider having collected most World Championship points at the end of the series. In case of a tie between one or more riders in the final overall classification, a run-off will decide the 1st, 2nd and 3rd place. For all other placings, the better-placed rider in the last final meeting will be the better placed rider.

See also 
 2012 Speedway Grand Prix
 2012 Team Speedway Junior World Championship

References 

 
2012
World Individual Junior